Vinzenz Maria Gredler (30 September 1823, in Telfs near Innsbruck – 4 May 1912, in Bozen) was an Austrian naturalist.

Gredler, who was a Dominican friar, first studied classics (1835–1841) then  philosophy and  theology (1842–1848). He then studied natural sciences at the Gymnasium in Halle (1848–1849). Without other qualifications, he succeeded in gaining a natural history diploma. He then served as director of the Franciscan Gymnasium in Bozen from 1849 to 1901.

Gredler wrote 338 publications on various subjects: geology, mineralogy, botany, zoology (mammals, birds, reptiles, amphibians, molluscs, insects), art, anthropology, history, etc. He made numerous  excursions in the Tyrol and had a  rich natural history  collection with the aid of the other seminarists and his pupils. This is today conserved in the museum of the  Gymnasium of Bolzano (or Museo Tirolese di Scienze Naturali del Ginnasio dei Padri Francescani).

The scientific journal "Gredleriana" is named in his honor.

Bibliography 
 Gredler V. M. 1853. Bemerkungen über einige Conchylien der Gattungen Pupa und Pomatias. Programm des Gymnasiums von Bozen 3: 45-52.
 Gredler V. 1856. Tirol’s Land- und Süsswasser-Conchylien I. Die Landconchylien.. Verhandlungen des Zoologisch-Botanischen Vereins in Wien, (Abhandlungen) 6: 25-162, 2 tables, Bozen.
 1856. Die Ameisen Tirol’s. Bozen
 1863. Die Käfer von Tirol nach ihrer horizontalen und vertikalen Verbreitung. Bozen.
 1868. Die Urgletscher-Moränen aus dem Eggenthale. Bozen.
 Gredler V. 1877. Mittheilungen aus dem Gebiete der Malakozoologie. Nachrichtsblatt der Deutschen Malakozoologischen Gesellschaft 9 (1): 1-6. Frankfurt am Main.
 1893. Zur Conchylien-Fauna von China. Bozen.
 1895. Die Porphyre der Umgebung von Bozen und ihre mineralogischen Einschlüsse. Bozen

References  
Cesare Conci et Roberto Poggi (1996), Iconography of Italian Entomologists, with essential biographical data. Memorie della Società entomologica Italiana, 75 : 159-382. 
Pietro Lorenzi & Silvio Bruno (2002). Uomini, storie, serpenti contributi alla storiografia erpetologica del Trentino-Alto Adige e Dintorni. Annali del Museo Civico di Rovereto, 17 : 173-274.

1823 births
1912 deaths
People from Innsbruck-Land District
Austrian naturalists
19th-century Austrian zoologists
19th-century Austrian botanists
Austrian entomologists